The 2002–03 Durand Cup Final was the 115th final of the Durand Cup, the oldest football competition in India, and was contested between Kolkata giant East Bengal and Army XI on 10 January 2003 at the Ambedkar Stadium in Delhi.

East Bengal won the final 3–0 to claim their 15th Durand Cup title. Mike Okoro, Kalia Kulothungan and Douglas Silva scored three goals in the second half as East Bengal won the title.

Route to the final

East Bengal

East Bengal entered the 2002–03 Durand Cup as one of the National Football League teams. They were allocated into Group B alongside MEG FC and Air India. In the opening game East Bengal defeated Air India 4–0. Mike Okoro scored a brace, Sashti Duley scored one and Osberne D'Souza scored an own-goal. In the second game, East Bengal suffered a 0–1 defeat to MEG, Bangalore as Ajith Kumar scored the only goal of the game. East Bengal still topped the group with a better goal difference and progressed into the last four. In the semi-final, East Bengal defeated Salgaocar 1–0 courtesy of a solitary strike by Mike Okoro as East Bengal reached the final.

Army XI

Army XI entered the 2002–03 Durand Cup as one of the regimental teams and were allocated into Group C alongside Vasco and Indian Telephone Industries. In the opening game, Army XI drew 2–2 with Indian Telephone Industries. Raghu Kumar and Johny Gangmei scored for Army XI while Ibrahim Karim and Ignatious (own-goal) scored for ITI. In the second game, Army XI defeated Vasco 1–0 as Bikash Gurung scored the only goal and Army reached the last four In the semi-final, Army XI defeated Mohammedan Sporting 5–3 in the penalty shootout after the game ended 1–1 after added extra time to reach the final for the first time. Saroj Gurung equalised for Army in the injury time for Army XI after Dipendu Biswas had scored for Mohammedan Sporting.

Match

Details

See also
 115th "Pepsi" Durand Cup 2002/03, rsssf.com
 115th "Pepsi" Durand Cup 2002/03, indianfootball.de

References

Durand Cup finals
East Bengal Club matches
2002–03 in Indian football